Roberto Alarcón may refer to:

 Roberto Alarcón (footballer, born 1994), Spanish football winger for Burgos
 Roberto Alarcón (footballer, born 1998), Spanish football defender for FC Tucson